Right Between the Promises is the sixth studio album by singer-songwriter Freedy Johnston. It was released in 2001 on Elektra Records.

Reception
AllMusic's Kenneth Bays describes the album as "simultaneously the flip side of, and a companion piece to, 1999's Blue Days Black Nights. Where that album's songs flowed with an ominous energy barely concealed by the moody, hushed tones of their surface, Promises forces those same emotions out into the light." Resulting in "[s]mart, darkly ambiguous songs that nevertheless seem built for high-volume, summertime play." Concluding "Right Between the Promises may not be as richly nuanced as [Johnston's] very best work, but it's still a fine example of his idiosyncratic brand of intelligent, radio-friendly folk-rock."

Rolling Stone's James Hunter called the album "[c]omposed songs about being confused." Noting that Johnston "just sings his modestly fluid, sweet-toned tunes in a voice to match."

Track listing
All songs written by Freedy Johnston, except where noted.
"Broken Mirror" – 2:39
"Waste Your Time" – 3:55
"Love Grows" (Tony Macaulay, Barry Mason) – 2:28
"That's Alright with Me" – 4:57
"Radio for Heartache" – 2:37
"Back to My Machine" – 5:05
"Arriving on a Train" – 4:20
"Save Yourself, City Girl" – 3:49
"Anyone" – 3:45
"In My Dream" – 4:21

Personnel
Freedy Johnston – vocals, guitar
Cameron Greider – guitar, piano, bass, percussion, background vocals
Alan Berozi – drums
Butch Vig – drums
Bon Hamlet – drums
Graham Maby – bass
Paul Eske – bass
Phil Lyons – bass
Jay Moran – piano, background vocals
Mary Gaines – background vocals
Christine Gatti – background vocals
James Cowan – percussion
John Vriesacker – violin
Karl Lavine – cello
Tina Kakuske – flute
Mark Haines – guitar, tambourine
Tom Williams – tambourine

References

2001 albums
Freedy Johnston albums
Elektra Records albums